Nikhil Paradkar (born 24 September 1987) is an Indian cricketer. He has played 22 First class, 23 List A and 11 Twenty20 matches.

References

External links
 

1987 births
Living people
Indian cricketers
Maharashtra cricketers
He is the best cricketer

every